Walbridge or Wallbridge may refer to:

Places
Walbridge, Ohio, USA
Wallbridge, a community in the municipality of Quinte West, Ontario
Wallbridge, Ontario, an unincorporated area in the Parry Sound District, Ontario
Wallbridge, an area in the civil parish of Rodborough, England named for the historic Wallbridge across the Thames and Severn Canal

People

Cyrus Walbridge (1849–1921), 28th mayor of St. Louis, Missouri (1893–1897)
David S. Walbridge (1802–1868), U.S. Representative from Michigan
Henry Sanford Walbridge (1801–1869), U.S. Representative from New York
Hiram Walbridge (1821–1870), U.S. Representative from New York
Larry Walbridge (1897–1982), American football player